Tscherne may refer to:

Franz Tscherne
Tscherne classification